Quimic Equip Rugby is a Spanish rugby team based in Barcelona.

External links
Quimic Equip Rugby

Rugby union teams in Catalonia
Sports clubs in Barcelona
Rugby clubs established in 1987
1987 establishments in Catalonia